Taylor Hart (born February 22, 1991) is a former American football offensive tackle. He was drafted as a defensive tackle by the Eagles in the fifth round of the 2014 NFL Draft before switching to offensive tackle. He played college football at Oregon.

High school
Hart attended Tualatin High School in Tualatin, Oregon, where he was a first-team all-state selection on both offense and defense.

Considered a three-star recruit by Rivals.com, he was rated as the 26th best strongside defensive end prospect of his class, and second best prospect from the state of Oregon.

College career
Hart attended the University of Oregon from 2009 to 2013, where he was a member of the Oregon Ducks football team. During his career, he accumulated 173 tackles, including 22 for loss, 16 sacks, 11 pass deflections and five forced fumbles.  As a senior, he recorded a career season high 72 tackles, and was named a second-team All-Pac-12 selection.

Taylor met his wife, Lauren Hart in December 2010. The two married in March 2015.

Professional career

Philadelphia Eagles
He was drafted by the Philadelphia Eagles in the fifth round (141st overall) of the 2014 NFL Draft. On September 4, 2016, he was released by the Eagles.

San Francisco 49ers
On September 5, 2016, Hart was claimed off waivers by the 49ers. He was released on October 22, 2016.

Second stint with Eagles
On October 24, 2016, the Philadelphia Eagles claimed Hart off waivers. Throughout the season, Hart took snaps at offensive tackle with the scout team. On January 18, 2017, the Eagles announced they officially moved him from defensive end to offensive tackle. He was waived on September 2, 2017. He was re-signed by the Eagles to a two-year contract after an injury to Jason Peters. He was released on November 14, 2017.

On February 14, 2018, Hart re-signed with the Eagles. He was released on September 1, 2018.

References

External links
Oregon Ducks bio

1991 births
Living people
Players of American football from Oregon
People from Tualatin, Oregon
Sportspeople from the Portland metropolitan area
American football defensive ends
Oregon Ducks football players
Philadelphia Eagles players
San Francisco 49ers players